Patrick Brolan (26 October 1881 – 21 July 1956) was an Irish hurler who played for the Tipperary senior team.

Brolan joined the team during the 1906 championship and was a regular member of the starting fifteen until his retirement after the 1919 championship. During that time he won two All-Ireland medals and three Munster medals.

At club level Brolan won numerous county championship medals with Thurles Sarsfield's.

References

1881 births
1956 deaths
Thurles Sarsfields hurlers
Tipperary inter-county hurlers
All-Ireland Senior Hurling Championship winners